Pai Ya-tsan (born 8 January 1945) is a Taiwanese political activist. During his imprisonment, Amnesty International designated Pai a prisoner of conscience.

Raised in Changhua County, Pai studied law at National Chengchi University. His political involvement began in 1969, campaigning for Huang Hsin-chieh, who won election to the Legislative Yuan. Suspected of sedition, Pai was jailed for four months in 1971, then released. In 1973, he supported a number of tangwai candidates for Taipei City Council. Pai chose to contest the legislative election of 1975, but was arrested in October for distributing campaign fliers which contained 29 questions addressed to Chiang Ching-kuo, as well as political policies suggested by Pai. The next month, he went to trial and was sentenced to life imprisonment by a military court. While imprisoned he went on hunger strikes to protest foreign policies and political repression. In February 1986, legislators Chiang Peng-chien and Fang Su-min petitioned for Pai's release. Instead, Pai's prison sentence was commuted to fifteen years upon the lifting of martial law in July 1987. Throughout the year, Pai's health continued to decline, and he was released in April 1988.

In November 2018, Pai contested the Changhua County magistracy as an independent candidate.

References

1945 births
Living people
National Chengchi University alumni
People from Changhua County
Amnesty International prisoners of conscience held by Taiwan
Prisoners sentenced to life imprisonment by Taiwan
Taiwanese prisoners sentenced to life imprisonment
Hunger strikers